Xingning Basin, located in Xingning, China, is the largest basin in east Guangdong province.  It spans 302 km2. Ostracode fossils from at least a dozen species in ten genera have been found there, from both the Early and Late Cretaceous.

References

External links
Federation of American Scientists - photos and map.

Cretaceous China
Landforms of Guangdong